Cockos, Inc is an American digital audio technology company founded in 2004, most notable for their digital audio workstation software REAPER.

History

Cockos was founded in 2004 by Justin Frankel after his departure from Nullsoft. The company name stems from mis-hearing a quote from the movie Office Space.
While the company also develops small software tools often released under an open source license its main focus is on music software. They released their first music software product, a programmable effects processing software called Jesusonic, on December 21, 2004. Following up in 2005, they released the online music jam software NINJAM under the GPL, with the release of their flagship product REAPER following later that year.

Staff

Cockos currently has two programmers. Justin Frankel, the company founder, probably best known for his work on the Winamp media player application, and John Schwartz, who joined Cockos in 2008 and is the author of many audio plug-ins, notably a virtual analogue synthesizer called Olga. Christophe Thibault, an old colleague of Frankel's from his Nullsoft days, was a Cockos employee between 2005-2014. Thibault is a French programmer and was the founder of the Kaillera and K-Meleon projects. In April 2014 he moved to Blizzard Entertainment.

References

External links
 

Companies based in San Francisco
Software companies established in 2004